Mats Rits (born 18 July 1993) is a Belgian professional footballer who plays as a central midfielder for Club Brugge. He made his professional debut at age 16 at Germinal Beerschot, where he was formed. He then moved to the famed Ajax academy system before moving back to his native Belgium to play in the Belgian First Division A.

Career

Germinal Beerschot
Rits made his debut at the highest level of Belgian football in a 3–1 win over VC Westerlo. He came on the pitch in the 30th minute as a replacement for the injured Daniel Cruz. Mats Rits scored the equalizer and the last goal of the match.

During his youth career, several bigger clubs showed interest in the Belgium youth international, who had captained his country at the Under-17 level. RSC Anderlecht, Real Madrid, and Ajax were all clubs that expressed an interest in Rits.

Ajax
On 28 June 2011, Rits signed a contract with Ajax. He scored his first goal for Ajax in a friendly match against VV Buitenpost on 2 July 2011 in the 75th minute, with the match ending in a 4–0 away win for Ajax. Four days later on 6 July 2011, Rits scored an additional two goals in the 64th and 70th minutes in a friendly fixture against AZSV Aalten. The match ended in a 11–0 away win for the Amsterdam side. Suffering a back injury during practice, Rits was sidelined for the entire 2011–12 season, and for the first half of the 2012–13 season. He appeared in a couple more friendly fixtures for Ajax while recuperating, but was unable to find his way back into the A-Selection. On 9 October 2012, Rits scored the only goal for Ajax in a 1–1 draw at home, in the 76th minute, in a friendly match against Slovakia club AS Trenčín.

KV Mechelen
Unable to break through into the first team in Amsterdam following his injury, Rits returned to Belgium, signing a 2.5-year contract with KV Mechelen during the Winter transfer window, on 6 January 2013.

Club Brugge
In the 2018 Summer transfer window, Rits was transferred to Club Brugge.

Career statistics

Honours
Club Brugge
 Belgian First Division A: 2019–20, 2020–21
 Belgian Super Cup: 2018, 2021

References

External links
 Player info at the official Germinal Beerschot website 
 Player info at sporza.be 
 
 

1993 births
Living people
Footballers from Antwerp
Belgian footballers
Association football midfielders
Belgium youth international footballers
Beerschot A.C. players
Belgian Pro League players
Eredivisie players
Jong Ajax players
AFC Ajax players
K.V. Mechelen players
Club Brugge KV players
Belgian expatriate footballers
Belgian expatriate sportspeople in the Netherlands
Expatriate footballers in the Netherlands